Caucus of Mayors and Ostravak is a parliamentary group in the Czech Senate.

Members 
5 senators:
 TOP 09 and Mayors and Independents: Jaromír Štětina, a senator re-elected in 2010, Jan Horník senator re-elected in 2010, Luděk Jeništa senator elected in 2012
 Ostravak: Leopold Sulovský, a senator elected in 2012
 Mayors and Independents and Citizens for Budějovice : Jiří Šesták, a senator elected in 2012

Former members 
 Freedom Union–Democratic Union: 1 senator elected in 2002
 Liberal Reform Party: 1 senator elected in 2002
 Path of Change: 1 senator elected in 2002
 Independent Mayors for Region: 1 senator elected in 2002
 Party for the Open Society: Soňa Paukrtová, a senator re-elected in 2006
 Civic Democratic Alliance: Karel Schwarzenberg, Foreign minister, a senator elected in 2004

See also 
 Senate of the Czech Republic
 2008 Czech Senate election

TOP 09
Mayors and Independents
Senate of the Czech Republic